Saint-Laurent-de-Cuves (literally Saint-Laurent of Cuves) is a commune in the Manche department in Normandy in north-western France.

It hosts the annual rock music festival "Papillons de Nuit". The 2008 festival had approximately 50,000 spectators over three days. Acts included Stereophonics, Camille, Babyshambles, Yael Naïm, and The Hives.

See also
Communes of the Manche department

References

Saintlaurentdecuves